Kakavadzor or Kaqavadzor may refer to:
Kakavadzor, Aragatsotn, Armenia
Kakavadzor, Kotayk, Armenia
Kuropatkino, Azerbaijan